"Swerve City" is a song by American alternative metal band Deftones. It is the opening track on their seventh studio album, Koi No Yokan (2012), and was released as a single on March 30, 2013, where it peaked at No. 6 on the Billboard Mainstream Rock Tracks. Belching Beaver released a limited edition IPA beer named after the song in 2019.

Music video 
The first music video for "Swerve City", directed by Gus Black, was released on May 9, 2013. It shows a woman (Tamara Feldman) in the desert riding a horse to her home (a ranch bungalow). While brushing her horse outside the bungalow, Chino Moreno is seen heading towards her home in a Porsche Panamera. The woman notices the car headlights as Moreno arrives outside the home. Subsequently, she walks outside and pulls out a pistol.

A second music video was released on July 2, 2013, directed by Ryan Mackfall. This performance video featured tour footage of the band.

Track listing

Personnel 
Deftones
 Chino Moreno – vocals, guitar
 Stephen Carpenter – guitar
 Abe Cunningham – drums
 Frank Delgado – keyboards, samples, turntables
 Sergio Vega – bass guitar

Production
 Nick Raskulinecz – producer

References

External links
Swerve City music video

2012 songs
2013 singles
Deftones songs
Song recordings produced by Nick Raskulinecz
Songs written by Chino Moreno
Reprise Records singles
Songs written by Stephen Carpenter
Songs written by Abe Cunningham
Songs written by Sergio Vega (bassist)
Songs written by Frank Delgado (American musician)
Groove metal songs